Tunisia competed at the 2018 Mediterranean Games in Tarragona, Spain from 22 June to 1 July 2018.

Medals

Karate 

Nader Azzoauzi won the silver medal in the men's kumite 60 kg event.

Swimming 

Men

Women

References 

Nations at the 2018 Mediterranean Games
2018
2018 in Tunisian sport